She Is the Only One (Swedish: Hon, den enda) is a 1926 Swedish silent drama film directed by Gustaf Molander and starring Alphons Fryland, Vera Voronina and Ivan Hedqvist. The film was based on a nineteenth century play by Alfred de Musset. It was shot at the Råsunda Studios in Stockholm and on location in Paris, Biarritz and the Château d'Abbadia in France. The film's sets were designed by the art director Vilhelm Bryde. It was distributed in Germany by UFA who may have input on the film's production decisions.

Cast
 Alphons Fryland as Valentin von Zanten
 Vera Voronina as 	Dolores del Prado
 Ivan Hedqvist as 	Louis van Zanten
 Margit Manstad as 	Inez Maria
 Gunnar Unger as 	Donald Brooke
 Edvin Adolphson as The Friend
 Lydia Potechina as	Rosa del Prado
 Axel Hultman as Inn Keeper
 Sven Bergvall as Jealous Man
 Maja Cassel as Wife of the jealous man
 Ragnar Arvedson as Secretary
 Brita Appelgren as 	Young Dolores 
 Justus Hagman as 	Servant 
 Nils Ohlin as 	Visitor 
 Tom Walter as Boy at the inn
 Torsten Winge as 	Visitor

References

Bibliography
 Gustafsson, Tommy. Masculinity in the Golden Age of Swedish Cinema: A Cultural Analysis of 1920s Films. McFarland, 2014.
 Qvist, Per Olov & von Bagh, Peter. Guide to the Cinema of Sweden and Finland. Greenwood Publishing Group, 2000.

External links

1926 films
1926 drama films
Swedish drama films
Swedish silent feature films
Swedish black-and-white films
Films directed by Gustaf Molander
1920s Swedish-language films
Swedish films based on plays
Films shot in Paris
Films set in Paris
Silent drama films
1920s Swedish films
Films based on works by Alfred de Musset